Rocca la Meja is a mountain in the Cottian Alps, in the comune of Canosio, Piedmont, northern Italy. It has an altitude of 2,831 m and it is located in the Maira Valley.

Of pyramidal shape, it is mostly composed of dolomitic limestone, and stands in a plateau known as Meja-Gardetta.

Geography 
Administratively the mountain belongs to the Province of Cuneo.

Nearby there is a lake called Lago della Meja.

SOIUSA classification 
According to the SOIUSA (International Standardized Mountain Subdivision of the Alps) the mountain can be classified in the following way:
 main part = Western Alps
 major sector = South Western Alps
 section = Cottian Alps
 subsection = southern Cottian Alps
 supergroup = Catena Chambeyron-Mongioia-Marchisa
 group = gruppo Gruppo dell'Oserot
 subgroup = Gruppo della Meja
 code = I/A-4.I-A.2.b

References

Mountains of Piedmont
Mountains of the Alps
Two-thousanders of Italy